Gembrook Station is located in the township of Gembrook. It was opened with the line on 18 December,1900 and closed on 30 April, 1954.

The line was rebuilt to the Gembrook terminus in 1998 by the Puffing Billy Railway. Heritage steam trains operated by Puffing Billy now stop at a new "Town" platform located on the site of a former siding. A "heritage" station has also been constructed on the site of the original Gembrook station. It has a layout very similar to that of the station in the 1920s, with only minor alterations to meet modern requirements.

External links
 Melway map at street-directory.com.au

Tourist railway stations in Melbourne
Railway stations in the Shire of Cardinia